Disney Friends is a simulation and adventure video game released in 2007 by Amaze Entertainment for the Nintendo DS loosely based on several animated Disney films. Published by Disney Interactive Studios, the game features characters Stitch from Lilo & Stitch, Dory from Finding Nemo, Pooh from Winnie the Pooh, Simba from The Lion King and an LGM from Toy Story. Players are able to befriend and interact with each film character through the Nintendo DS' microphone and touch screen, which influence the activities and emotions of the game's characters. The game features a fixed language for both text and voices in each version.

Gameplay
Disney Friends features adventure elements which offer players the opportunity to bond with the characters, while exploring film environments and moments. All activities and interactions are meant to teach players about responsibility, nurture, and the importance of helping others. Tinker Bell provides guidance as the player progresses through the game. The player is tasked to look after the featured Disney characters. This includes feeding them regularly. There is Peanut Butter & Jelly Sandwich and Space Chicken, Kelp Crunchy, Honey Cake, and Bug Crunchy for Stitch, Dory, Pooh, Simba and the LGM respectively. Various collectibles can be earned as the player completes tasks and achievements, such as readable pins and gold currency to buy food, clothes, and toys.

The game allows players to experience special events are holidays by utilizing the Nintendo DS' clock. The game contains a day/night cycle which affects the behavior of characters and gameplay. The game also features the option to connect wireless or online via Nintendo Wi-Fi Connection in order to interrelate with the player's friends' worlds. As of May 20, 2014, the online feature is no longer available for this game.

Reception
Disney Friends received mostly mixed reviews. The game is seen as a "Nintendogs-like life sim with Disney characters". Parents appraised the game as a fun, learning experience for kids. On the other hand, older audiences claim this game is only for small children, ascertaining that it's not an original game but still enjoyable. Ken McKown of ZTGD states the "recognizable characters will appeal to fans young and old", noting its usage of memorable Disney characters for fans.

On release week, Famitsu scored the game a 22 out of 40.

References

External links
IGN page

2007 video games
2008 video games
Crossover video games
Finding Nemo
Lilo & Stitch (franchise) video games
Nintendo DS games
Nintendo DS-only games
The Lion King (franchise) video games
Toy Story video games
Video games developed in the United States
Winnie-the-Pooh video games
Multiplayer and single-player video games
Amaze Entertainment games